Belgian rock is rock music from Belgium. It was originally inspired by rock and roll music from America and the United Kingdom in the 1960s, but later evolved to be influenced by other genres including alternative rock and electronic music.

Languages
Because Belgium is a federal country with strong cultural identities - a French-speaking area in the south (Wallonia) and a Dutch-speaking area in the north (Flanders), with different media networks, and publicly supported cultural institutions, the indie rock scene emerged slightly later in Wallonia.

History

Rock and roll began emerging in Belgium as in many other European countries in the sixties, a few years after the commercial breakthrough of Elvis Presley.

Many ballroom orchestras were then to find in the whole country, mostly covering or mimicking international rock bands like The Shadows or The Beatles. Some of them became famous after releasing original (although strongly inspired) compositions, like  "The Cousins" (Kiliwatch, 1960), "The Jokers" (Cecilia, 1963), "The Shakespears" (Shake it over, 1965), "The Pebbles" (Seven horses in the sky, 1968), "The Wallace Collection" (Daydream, 1969). 

Other noticeable artist have evolved from previously well established musical genres, including blues and folk like the Antwerps protest singer "Ferre Grignard" (Ring Ring, Drunken Sailor, 1966).

After this "mimicking" rock and roll era, indie rock band like TC Matic or De Kreuners, and many punk rock-dark wave like "Nacht und Nebel", "The Paranoiacs" and Siglo XX meet significant audience, starting to release songs in their mother language. Some (like the "eurorock" band Machiavel and the pop/punk singer Plastic Bertrand) were also managed in a more commercial approach.

Raised in 1981 in the noise genre Antwerp houses the pioneer band Club Moral. As in most northern Europe countries, the hard rock–metal scene has its first icons with Kleptomania and Irish Coffee.

In the nineties, Belgium (and especially Flanders) was deeply experiencing the electronic music breakthrough, with the emergence of huge night clubs and a local scene called New Beat. As a reaction, a strong alternative rock scene, relayed by a growing number of rock festivals (every single local youth organization in the country has its own, following the emergence of major events like Rock Werchter, public radio station Studio Brussel and music contest Humo's Rock Rally) in various rock subgenres (mainly hard rock, pop rock, experimental-rock, punk-rock and progressive-rock). Many bands finally started to achieve larger international acclaim and success. 

A lively indie rock scene sprouts in Antwerp, where dEUS is probably the most famous, next to other people and groups like Zita Swoon (formerly Moondog Jr), Evil Superstars, Kiss My Jazz, Dead Man Ray, K's Choice, Admiral Freebee, A Brand and Die Anarchistische Abendunterhaltung. Mauro Pawlowski as well as Rudy Trouvé are key figures in the Antwerp scene besides playing or have played in dEUS, they also play solo as well as in lesser known bands and as improvisers in jam sessions and experimental concerts. Pawlowski played in numerous bands, including Mitsoobishy Jacson, Kiss my Jazz, Monguito, Shadowgraphic City, dEUS, The Love Substitutes, Othin Spake, The Parallels, Club Moral, Archetypes of the Multisabanas and I Hate Camera. Pawlowski has released solo work under various aliases: Mauro Pawlowski, and Somnabula. Trouvé played in Dead Man Ray, dEUS, Gore Slut, I Hate Camera, Kiss My Jazz, The Love Substitutes, Rudy Trouvé Sextet/Septet, POX, and Rudy and the Unforgettable Wally's.

This evolution spread through the whole country, from Limburg (Noordkaap, Evil Superstars) to Brussels (Venus, Sharko, Channel Zero) via Ghent (Gorki, Millionaire, Soulwax, An Pierlé). Other noticeable artists are Ozark Henry, Hooverphonic or K's Choice.

Although "Radio 21" was created in 1981 (two years prior to its Flemish counterpart "Studio Brussel"), the Dour Festival has only turned into a resolutely indie festival in the middle of the nineties, and groups like Ghinzu found international success in the late nineties.

In the 2000s, the Belgian rock scene can be considered mature, with a consistent and extended network of venues, producers, tour managers, media, festival and public support for both indie and more commercial artists. 

Although the hip-hop and electronic scenes have also grown in popularity, groups like Girls in Hawaii, Arid, Vive la Fête, Triggerfinger or Absynthe Minded.

Belgian bands and artists

 2 Many DJs
 Absynthe Minded
 Admiral Freebee
 Arid
 Arno Hintjens
 Arsenal
 A brand
 Betty Goes Green
 Brainticket
 Club Moral
 Creature with the Atom Brain
 Daan
 DAAU
 Das Pop
 Dead Man Ray
 dEUS
 Été 67
 Evil Superstars
 Fixkes
 Freaky Age
 Funeral Dress
 Ghinzu
 Girls in Hawaii
 Hooverphonic
 The Scabs
 Janez Detd
 K's Choice
 Machiavel
 Millionaire
 Milow
 mint
 Mud Flow
 Nailpin
 The Neon Judgement
 Novastar
 Ozark Henry
 Poésie Noire
 Puggy
 Sharko
 Siglo XX
 Soulsister
 Soulwax
 TC Matic
 Team William
 The Black Box Revelation
 The Hickey Underworld
 The Kids
 The Radios
 The Sore Losers
 The Tellers
 Thou
 Triggerfinger
 Univers Zero
 Wallace Collection
 Will Z.
 Zita Swoon
 Zornik

See also
 List of Belgian bands and artists

References

External links
 Music in Belgium
 timeline of Belgium music

Rock
Rock music by country